Taro Daniel was the defending champion but chose not to defend his title.

Elias Ymer won the title after defeating Roberto Carballés Baena 6–2, 6–3 in the final.

Seeds

Draw

Finals

Top half

Bottom half

References
Main Draw
Qualifying Draw

Internazionali di Tennis del Friuli Venezia Giulia - Singles
2017 Singles
Friuli